The 1985 IAAF World Race Walking Cup was held on 28 and 29 September 1985 in the streets of St John's, Isle of Man.  The event was also known as IAAF Race Walking World Cup.

Complete results were published.

Medallists

Results

Men's 20 km

Men's 50 km

Team (men)
The team rankings, named Lugano Trophy, combined the 20 km and 50 km events team results.

Women's 10 km

Team (women)

Participation
The participation of 158 athletes (110 men/48 women) from  countries is reported.

 (4/-)
 (8/4)
 (7/4)
 (4/4)
 (7/-)
 (-/4)
 (8/-)
 (-/4)
 (3/-)
 (8/4)
 (5/-)
 (8/-)
 (7/4)
 (8/4)
 (8/4)
 (9/4)
 (8/4)
 (8/4)

Qualifying rounds 
In 1985, there were qualifying rounds for both men's and women's competition with the first two winners proceeding to the final.

Men
This year, the Soviet Union, Italy, México, the United Kingdom, the United States, Algeria, Australia, China, Canada, Colombia, and Kenya proceeded directly to the final.  México withdrew due to the Mexico City earthquake.

Zone 1
Saint-Aubin-lès-Elbeuf, France, June 22/23

Zone 2
Borås, Sweden, June 15

Zone 3
Russe, Bulgaria, June 22/23

Women
This year, China, the Soviet Union, Australia, the United Kingdom, the United States, and Canada proceeded directly to the final.

Zone 1
Borås, Sweden, June 15

*: competed as non-scorers

Zone 2
Russe, Bulgaria, June 22

Zone 3
Saint-Aubin-lès-Elbeuf, France, June 2

References

External links
IAAF World Race Walking Cup 1961-2006 Facts & Figures - IAAF.org

World Athletics Race Walking Team Championships
World Race Walking Cup
Walking
Athletics in the Isle of Man
World Race Walking Cup
International sports competitions hosted by the Isle of Man